Tiago Henrique Bernardini Consoni (born 2 December 1979 in Araras) is a Brazilian football defender, currently playing for Velo Clube.

In summer 2009, he signed a one-year contract with the Slovakian side Spartak Trnava.

Honours
 Internacional
 Campeonato Gaúcho: 2002

Santos
 Campeonato Brasileiro Série A: 2002

References

1979 births
Living people
People from Araras
Brazilian people of Italian descent
Brazilian footballers
Brazilian expatriate footballers
Expatriate footballers in Switzerland
Expatriate footballers in Austria
Expatriate footballers in Slovakia
Expatriate footballers in Portugal
Brazilian expatriate sportspeople in Slovakia
Brazilian expatriate sportspeople in Switzerland
Brazilian expatriate sportspeople in Portugal
Brazilian expatriate sportspeople in Austria
Association football defenders
Campeonato Brasileiro Série A players
Campeonato Brasileiro Série C players
Campeonato Brasileiro Série D players
Swiss Super League players
Slovak Super Liga players
Sport Club Internacional players
Santos FC players
União São João Esporte Clube players
FC Thun players
SC Rheindorf Altach players
Guarani FC players
Coritiba Foot Ball Club players
Ituano FC players
FC Spartak Trnava players
G.D. Estoril Praia players
Rio Branco Esporte Clube players
Centro Sportivo Alagoano players
Independente Futebol Clube players
Associação Esportiva Velo Clube Rioclarense players
Nacional Futebol Clube players
Footballers from São Paulo (state)